Bernardoni is a surname. Notable people with the surname include:

 Giovanni Maria Bernardoni (1541–1605), Jesuit and Italian architect 
 Giuseppe Bernardoni (1897–1942), Italian sprinter
 Paul Bernardoni (born 1997), French footballer

See also
 Bernardini (disambiguation)